In blood banking, the fractions of Whole Blood used for transfusion are also called components.

See also
 Reference ranges for common blood tests

References

Blood
Human blood components